Krishnarajanagara is a town in Mysore district in the Indian state of Karnataka.

Demographics

 India census, Krishnarajanagara had a population of 30,603. Males constitute 51% of the population and females 49%. Krishnarajanagara has an average literacy rate of 73%, higher than the national average of 59.5%: male literacy is 78%, and female literacy is 68%. In Krishnarajanagara, 11% of the population is under 6 years of age.

See also
Saligrama, Mysore
Hosa Agrahara

References 

Cities and towns in Mysore district